The Taroko people, also known as Truku people, are an Indigenous Taiwanese people. Taroko is also the name of the area of Taiwan where the Taroko reside. The Executive Yuan, Republic of China has officially recognized the Taroko since 15 January 2004. The Taroko are the 12th aboriginal group in Taiwan to receive this recognition.

Previously, the Taroko and the related Seediq people were classified in the Atayal group. The Taroko people demanded a separate status for themselves in a "name rectification" campaign.

The Taroko resisted and fought the Japanese in the 1914 Truku War.

Notable people
 Bokeh Kosang, actor and singer
 Chen Tao-ming, politician
 Lin Yueh-han, footballer
 Tseng Shu-chin, singer

See also
 Truku language
 Mona Rudao
 Wushe Incident
 Taiwanese indigenous peoples

References